The Bilsam Sky Walker I is a Polish powered parachute designed and produced by Bilsam Aviation of Poznań. The aircraft is supplied as a complete ready-to-fly-aircraft.

The company's website is non-functional and has been so since about 2008, so it is not clear if the company is still in business.

Design and development
It features a  parachute-style wing, single-place accommodation, tricycle landing gear and a single two stroke  Radne Motor AB engine in pusher configuration. The Bilsam TNA four-stroke engine is a factory option.

The aircraft carriage is built from a combination of composite material and steel tubing. In flight steering is accomplished via handles that actuate the canopy brakes, creating roll and yaw. On the ground the aircraft has foot pedal-controlled nosewheel steering. The main landing gear incorporates spring rod suspension.

The Sky Walker I can be fitted with a choice of three wings, Matrix, Pelikan or Condor all manufactured by Bilsam.

The Sky Walker II is a two-seat variant with an enclosed cockpit.

Specifications (Sky Walker I)

References

External links

Sky Walker I
2000s Polish sport aircraft
2000s Polish ultralight aircraft
Single-engined pusher aircraft
Powered parachutes